Cycas vespertilio is a species of cycad endemic to the Philippines.

Range
Cycas vespertilio has been recorded in:
Luzon: Camarines Sur (Panagan River)
Mindoro: Mindoro Oriental (Mount Yagaw)
Marinduque (Torrijos, Bonliw, Talisay)
Panay: Iloilo (Barotac Viejo, Nagpana)
Negros: Negros Oriental and Occidental
Cebu
Leyte: Leyte (Gigantangan)
Samar

References

vespertilio